The Ohio highway sniper attacks were a series of 24 sniper attacks along Interstate 270 and other nearby highways in the central part of the U.S. state of Ohio (mostly around Columbus) against traffic, homes, and a school building in the Hamilton Local School district in Columbus, Ohio. The shootings began in May 2003 and continued for several months. One person was killed (62-year-old Gail Knisley, killed on November 25, 2003), and the shootings caused widespread fear.

The suspect, Charles A. McCoy Jr., was arrested in Las Vegas on March 17, 2004. McCoy, who had been diagnosed with paranoid schizophrenia in 1996, stood trial in 2005. The first trial with death penalty charges resulted in a hung jury on May 9, 2005, most likely due to McCoy's severe mental illness. Rather than face a retrial, McCoy accepted a plea arrangement where he avoided the death sentence. After pleading guilty to involuntary manslaughter and ten other counts, he was sentenced to 27 years in prison on August 9, 2005.

See also
Beltway sniper attacks (October 2002)
2003 West Virginia sniper
Phoenix freeway shootings

External links
Court TV coverage of Ohio sniper Charles McCoy
Ohio Department of Corrections Offender Information on Charles McCoy Jr

2003 murders in the United States
Interstate 70
Murder in Ohio
Deaths by firearm in Ohio
2003 in Ohio
Crimes in Ohio
Attacks in the United States in 2003

References